"Bless My Soul" is a single from Powderfinger's first "best of" album, Fingerprints: The Best of Powderfinger, 1994-2000. The other new song on the album, "Process This," was not released as a single. Though the album is described as compiling hits from 1994-2000, this song was recorded by the band in 2004 especially for the Fingerprints album.

The song was written whilst the band was holidaying in Spain, according to lead singer Bernard Fanning. Several lyrics of the song refer to Spain and its national flag colours of "red and gold".

In Australia, the song was ranked #9 on Triple J's Hottest 100 of 2004.

Track listing
Music by Powderfinger. Lyrics by Bernard Fanning.
"Bless My Soul" - 4:06

Music video
The music video for "Bless My Soul" features lead singer Bernard Fanning walking along the rocks on the cliff face of a beach singing the song. The video's colour has been warped with an effect to make everything appear unnatural. These scenes are edited amongst scenes of the band playing the song.

Audio sample

References

Powderfinger songs
2005 singles
2004 songs
Universal Records singles
Songs written by Jon Coghill
Songs written by John Collins (Australian musician)
Songs written by Bernard Fanning
Songs written by Ian Haug
Songs written by Darren Middleton